Frutta e verdura is an album by Italian singer Mina, distributed back to back with the album Amanti di valore. 
The whole album was arranged by Pino Presti except for "Non tornare più" (Dario Baldan Bembo) and "Devo tornare a casa mia" (Natale Massara). Sound
engineer: Nuccio Rinaldis.

Some of the songs of this album have been recorded in different languages by Mina during the 1970s. "Non tornare più" was covered and released in French ("Les oiseaux reviennent") in a 1974 45rpm (in 1998, it was published in a French album compilation, Quand ma voix te touche). "Devo tornare a casa mia" was covered in 1975 in Spanish, "Debo volver ya con los mios", as well as "Questo sì, questo no" ("Esto sì, esto no"). "Domenica sera" has three different versions: in Spanish ("Domingo a la noche"), in German ("Die Liebe am Sonntag") and in English ("Don't Ask Me To Love You"). The hit "E poi..." was recorded in other four languages: English ("Runaway"), Spanish ("¿Y que?""), french ("Et puis ça sert à quoi") and German ("Und dann"). There are also two other Italian versions of the same song: in the live album Mina Live '78 and in 1992 album Sorelle Lumière, in which the song was mixed with Riccardo Cocciante's hit "Un nuovo amico". All the songs were released on 45rpm records or in unofficial album compilations.

Track listing

1973 albums
Mina (Italian singer) albums
Italian-language albums
Albums conducted by Pino Presti
Albums arranged by Pino Presti